Sverre Ingolf Haugli (23 April 1925 – 18 October 1986) was a Norwegian speed skater. He finished third at the European Championships in 1950 and fourth in the World Championships in 1951. He won a bronze medal at the 1952 Oslo Olympics, and placed sixth over 10,000 m in 1952 and fourth in 1956.

He is the grandfather of speed skaters Maren Haugli and Sverre Haugli.

Medals
An overview of medals won by Haugli at important championships he participated in, listing the years in which he won each:

Personal records
To put these personal records in perspective, the WR column lists the official world records on the dates that Haugli skated his personal records.

Haugli has an Adelskalender score of 188.126 points. His highest ranking on the Adelskalender was a ninth place.

References

External links

 Sverre Ingolf Haugli at SkateResults.com
 Sverre Ingolf Haugli. Deutsche Eisschnelllauf Gemeinschaft e.V. (German Skating Association).
 Evert Stenlund's Adelskalender pages
 Historical World Records. International Skating Union.
 National Championships results. Norges Skøyteforbund (Norwegian Skating Association).

1925 births
1986 deaths
Norwegian male speed skaters
Olympic speed skaters of Norway
Olympic bronze medalists for Norway
Speed skaters at the 1952 Winter Olympics
Speed skaters at the 1956 Winter Olympics
Olympic medalists in speed skating
Medalists at the 1952 Winter Olympics
People from Jevnaker
Sportspeople from Innlandet
20th-century Norwegian people